Uriu is a commune in Bistrița-Năsăud County, Transylvania, Romania. It is composed of four villages: Cristeștii Ciceului (Csicsókeresztúr), Hășmașu Ciceului (Csicsóhagymás), Ilișua (Alsóilosva), and Uriu.

History

Natives
Zsófia Torma

References

Communes in Bistrița-Năsăud County
Localities in Transylvania